Mahonia eutriphylla is a species of shrub in the Berberidaceae described as a species in 1901. It is endemic to northern and central Mexico, from Coahuila to Mexico State.

References

eutriphylla
Flora of Mexico
Plants described in 1901